Owyhee or Owhyhee is an older English spelling of Hawaii, used in the late 18th and early 19th centuries. It is found in the names of certain locations in the American part of the Pacific Northwest, which were explored and mapped by expeditions whose members included native Hawaiians:

 Owyhee, Nevada, a community in north-central Nevada
 Owyhee County, Idaho, the southwesternmost county of Idaho
 Owyhee River, a river in Idaho, Nevada, and Oregon
 Owyhee Dam, a dam on the river
 Lake Owyhee, a lake in Oregon
 Owyhee Desert, a desert in Nevada and Idaho
 Owyhee Mountains, a mountain range in Idaho and Oregon

See also 
 Owyhee Reservoir State Airport, an airport adjacent to Lake Owyhee
 USS Owyhee River (LFR-515), an amphibious assault ship of the United States Navy